The effect of organic farming has been a subject of interest for researchers. Theory suggests that organic farming practices, which exclude the use of most synthetic pesticides and fertilizers, may be beneficial for biodiversity. This is generally shown to be true for soils scaled to the area of cultivated land, where species abundance is, on average, 30% richer than that of conventional farms. However, for crop yield-scaled land the effect of organic farming on biodiversity is highly debated due to the significantly lower yields compared to conventional farms.

In ancient farming practices, farmers did not possess the technology or manpower to have a significant impact on the destruction of biodiversity even as mass-production agriculture was rising. Nowadays, common farming methods generally rely on pesticides to maintain high yields. With such, most agricultural landscapes favor mono-culture crops with very little flora or fauna co-existence (van Elsen 2000). Modern organic farm practices such as the removal of pesticides and the inclusion of animal manure, crop rotation, and multi-cultural crops provides the chance for biodiversity to thrive.

Benefits of organic farming to biodiversity

Nearly all non-crop, naturally occurring species observed in comparative farm land practice studies show a preference in organic farming both by population and richness. Spanning all associated species, there is an average of 30% more on organic farms versus conventional farming methods, however this does not account for possible loss of biodiversity due to decreased yields. Birds, butterflies, soil microbes, beetles, earthworms, spiders, vegetation, and mammals are particularly affected. Some organic farms may use less pesticides and thus biodiversity fitness and population density may benefit. Larger farms however tend to use pesticides more liberally and in some cases to larger extent than conventional farms. Many weed species attract beneficial insects that improve soil qualities and forage on weed pests. Soil-bound organisms often benefit because of increased bacteria populations due to natural fertilizer spread such as manure, while experiencing reduced intake of herbicides and pesticides commonly associated with conventional farming methods. Increased biodiversity, especially from soil microbes such as mycorhizae, have been proposed as an explanation for the high yields experienced by some organic plots, especially in light of the differences seen in a 21-year comparison of organic and control fields.

Impact of increased biodiversity

The level of biodiversity that can be yielded from organic farming provides a natural capital to humans. Species found in most organic farms provides a means of agricultural sustainability by reducing amount of human input (e.g. fertilizers, pesticides). Farmers that produce with organic methods reduce risk of poor yields by promoting biodiversity. Common game birds such as the ring-necked pheasant and the northern bobwhite often reside in agriculture landscapes, and are a natural capital yielded from high demands of recreational hunting. Because bird species richness and population are typically higher on organic farm systems, promoting biodiversity can be seen as logical and economical.

Highly impacted animal species

Earthworms

Earthworm population and diversity appears to have the most significant data out of all studies. Out of six studies comparing earthworm biodiversity to organic and conventional farming methods, all six suggested a preference for organic practices including a study at the pioneering Haughley farm in 1980/1981 that compared earthworm populations and soil properties after 40 years.  Hole et al. (2005) summarized a study conducted by Brown (1999) and found nearly double the population and diversity when comparing farming methods.

Birds

Organic farms are said to be beneficial to birds while remaining economical. Bird species are one of the most prominent animal groups that benefit from organic farming methods. Many species rely on farmland for foraging, feeding, and migration phases. With such, bird populations often relate directly to the natural quality of farmland. The more natural diversity of organic farms provides better habitats to bird species, and is especially beneficial when the farmland is located within a migration zone. In 5 recent studies almost all bird species including locally declining species, both population and variation increased on organic farmland,. Making a switch from conventional farming methods to organic practices also seems to directly improve bird species in the area. While organic farming improves bird populations and diversity, species populations receive the largest boost when organic groups are varied within a landscape. Bird populations are increased further with optimal habitat for biodiversity, rather than organic alone, with systems such as Conservation Grade.

Butterflies

A specific study done in the UK in 2006 found substantially more butterflies on organic farms versus standard farming methods except for two pest species. The study also observed higher populations in uncropped field margins compared with cropland edges regardless of farm practice. Conversely, Weibull et al. (2000) found no significant differences in species diversity or population.

Spiders

Ten studies have been conducted involving spider species and abundance on farm systems. All but three of the studies indicated that there was a higher diversity of spider species on organic farms, in addition to populations of species. Two of the studies indicated higher species diversity, but statistically insignificant populations between organic and standard farming methods.

Soil Microbes

Out of 13 studies comparing bacteria and fungus communities between organic and standard farming, 8 of the studies showed heightened level of growth on organic farm systems. One study concluded that the use of “green” fertilizers and manures was the primary cause of higher bacterial levels on organic farms. On the other hand, nematode population/diversity depended on what their primary food intake was. Bacteria-feeding nematodes showed preference towards organic systems whereas fungus-feeding nematodes showed preference for standard farm systems. The heightened level of bacteria-feeding nematodes makes sense due to higher levels of bacteria in organic soils, but the fungus-feeding populations being higher on standard farms seems to contradict the data since more fungi are generally found on organic farms.

Beetles

According to Hole et al. (2005), beetle species are among the most commonly studied animal species on farming systems. Twelve studies have found a higher population and species richness of carabids on organic systems. The overall conclusion of significantly higher carabid population species and diversity is that organic farms have a higher level of weed species where they can thrive. Staphylinid populations and diversity have seemed to show no specific preference with some studies showing higher population and diversity, some with lower population and diversity, and one study showed no statistical significance between the organic and conventional farming systems.

Mammals

Two comparative studies have been conducted involving mammal populations and diversity among farm practices. A study done by Brown (1999) found that small mammal population density and diversity did not depend on farming practices, however overall activity was higher on organic farms. It was concluded that more food resources were available to small mammals on organic farms because of the reduction or lack of herbicides and pesticides. Another study conducted by Wickramasinghe et al. (2003) compared bat species and activity. Species activity and foraging were both more than double on organic farms compared to conventional farms. Species richness was also higher on organic farms, and 2 of the sixteen species sighted were found only on organic farms.

Vegetation

Approximately ten studies have been conducted to compare non-crop vegetation between organic and conventional farming practices. Hedgerow, inner-crop and grassland observations were made within these studies and all but one showed a higher weed preference and diversity in or around organic farms. Most of these studies showed significant overall preference for organic farming preferences especially for broad-leafed species, but many grass species showed far less  on conventional farms likely because pesticide interaction was low or non-existent. Organic farm weed population and richness was believed to be lower in mid-crop land because of weed-removal methods such as under sowing.
Switching from conventional to organic farming often results in a “boom” of weed speciation due to intense chemical change of soil composition from the lack of herbicides and pesticides. Natural plant species can also vary on organic farms from year-to-year because crop rotation creates new competition based on the chemical needs of each crop.

Farmers’ Benefits from Increased Biodiversity

Biological research on soil and soil organisms has proven beneficial to the system of organic farming. Varieties of bacteria and fungi break down chemicals, plant matter and animal waste into productive soil nutrients. In turn, the producer benefits by healthier yields and more arable soil for future crops.  Furthermore, a 21-year study was conducted testing the effects of organic soil matter and its relationship to soil quality and yield. Controls included actively managed soil with varying levels of manure, compared to a plot with no manure input. After the study commenced, there was significantly lower yields on the control plot when compared to the fields with manure. The concluded reason was an increased soil microbe community in the manure fields, providing a healthier, more arable soil system.

Detriments to biodiversity through organic farming

Organic farming practices still require active participation from the farmer to effectively boost biodiversity. Making a switch to organic farming methods does not automatically or guarantee improved biodiversity. Pro-conservation ethics are required to create arable farm land that generates biodiversity. Conservationist ideals are commonly overlooked because they require additional physical and economical efforts from the producer.   
Common weed-removal processes like undercutting and controlled burning provides little opportunity for species survival, and often leads to comparable populations and richness to conventionally managed landscapes when performed in excess. Another common process is the addition of biotopes in the form of hedgerows and ponds to further improve species richness. Farmers commonly make the mistake of over-using these resources for more intense crop production because organic yields are typically lower. Another error comes from the over-stratification of biotopes. A series of small clusters does not provide adequate land area for high biodiversity potential.

Footnotes

References
 Hole, D.G., Perkins, A.J., Wilson, J.D., Alexander, I.H., Grice, P.V., Evans, A.D. (2005) Does organic farming benefit biodiversity? Biological Conservation 122: 113-130. https://www.researchgate.net/publication/222518861_Does_organic_farming_benefit_biodiversity_Biol._Conserv._122_113-130
Blakemore, R.J. (2000). Ecology of Earthworms under the ‘Haughley Experiment’of Organic and Conventional Management Regimes. Biological Agriculture and Horticulture, 18: 141-159. http://bio-eco.eis.ynu.ac.jp/eng/database/earthworm/Haughley%5CHaughley.pdf
Gabriel, D., and Tscharntke, T. (2007) Insect pollinated plants benefit from organic farming. Agriculture, Ecosystems and Environment 118: 43-48
 C.A. Bahlai , Yingen Xue , C.M. McCreary , A.W. Schaafsma , R.H. Hallett (2010) Choosing Organic Pesticides over Synthetic Pesticides May Not Effectively Mitigate Environmental Risk in Soybeans. 
Bengtsson, J., Ahnstrom, J., Weibull, A. (2005). The effects of organic agriculture on biodiversity and abundance: a meta-analysis. Journal of Applied Ecology 42: 261-269
Perrings et al. (2006) Biodiversity in Agricultural Landscapes: Saving Natural Capital without Losing Interest. Conservation Biology 20: 263-264
Beecher N.A. et al. (2002) Agroecology of Birds in Organic and Nonorganic Farmland. Conservation Biology 6: 1621-1630
Murphy, M.T., (2003) Avian Population Trends within the Evolving Agricultural Landscape of Eastern and Central United States. The Auk 120: 120-134
Brown, R.W., 1999b. Margin/field interfaces and small mammals. Aspects of Applied Biology 54, 203–210.
Wickramasinghe, L.P., Harris, S., Jones, G., Vaughan, N., 2003. Bat activity and species richness on organic and conventional farms: impact of agricultural intensification. Journal of Applied Ecology 40, 984–993.
Wheeler S.A. (2008) What influences agricultural professionals' views towards organic agriculture? Ecological Economics 65:145-154
Ingram M. (2007) Biology and Beyond: The Science of ‘‘Back to Nature’’ Farming in the United States. Annals of the Association of American Geographers 97:298-312
Fließbach A., Oberholzer H., Gunst L., and Mäder P. ( 2006). Soil organic matter and biological soil quality indicators after 21 years of organic and conventional farming. Agriculture, Ecosystems and Environment 118: 273-284
Professor Sir John Beddington (2013) Research project: Conservation farming - Testing the delivery of conservation schemes for farmland birds at the farm-scale during winter, in Southern lowland England. University of Southampton, Centre for Environmental Sciences, Masters Thesis, 32pp.
van Elsen T. (2000) Species diversity as a task for organic agriculture in Europe. Agriculture, Ecosystems & Environment 2000 Vol. 77 No. 1/2 pp. 101-109 http://www.cabdirect.org/abstracts/20001807027.html

Organic farming
Biodiversity